The Latino Caucus of the Chicago City Council is a bloc of aldermen in the Chicago City Council, composed of council members of Latino heritage and of those whose wards are majority Latino. During the 2019–23 term, the caucus consists of 12 members, out of the council's 50 aldermen.

Membership

Current members 
The following table lists current aldermen who are members of the Latino Caucus, as of April 2020.

Past members

Agenda and actions

2019–23 City Council term 
During the 2019 Chicago Public Schools strike, the Latino Caucus released a statement urging Chicago Public Schools to accept the Chicago Teachers Union's demands.

During the COVID-19 pandemic, the Latino Caucus endorsed legislation calling for temporary suspension rent and mortgage payments.

See also 
 Chicago Aldermanic Black Caucus
 Chicago City Council Democratic Socialist Caucus
 Chicago City Council LGBT Caucus
 Chicago City Council Progressive Reform Caucus

References 

Issue-based groups of legislators
Caucuses of the Chicago City Council
Hispanic and Latino American culture in Chicago